The 1898 Georgia Tech football team represented the Georgia Institute of Technology during the 1898 Southern Intercollegiate Athletic Association football season.

Schedule

References

Georgia Tech
Georgia Tech Yellow Jackets football seasons
College football winless seasons
Georgia Tech football